Lakkampatti is a panchayat town in Erode district in the Indian state of Tamil Nadu.

Demographics
 India census, Lakkampatti had a population of 11,057. Males constitute 51% of the population and females 49%. Lakkampatti has an average literacy rate of 62%, higher than the national average of 59.5%: male literacy is 71%, and female literacy is 53%. In Lakkampatti, 9% of the population is under 6 years of age.

References

Cities and towns in Erode district